Hemnesberget is a village in the municipality of Hemnes in Nordland county, Norway.  It is located on the Hemnes peninsula which lies on the south side of the Ranfjorden. Hemnes Church is located in this village.

World War II
The village was partially destroyed in the land fighting first and the later by naval gunfire, with the sinking of the Hurtigruten ship  and the coaster , in the days following 10 May 1940. The fighting occurred when Hemnesberget became the objective of a German operation to bypass Allied strong points during the Norwegian Campaign, codenamed Wildente.

Notable people

References

Hemnes
Villages in Nordland